Ryan Armagost is a state representative from Berthoud, Colorado. A Republican, Armagost represents Colorado House of Representatives District 64, which includes parts of Larimer and Weld counties in Colorado and includes the communities of Greeley, Johnstown, Berthoud, Millikin and Mead.

Background
Currently, Armagost works as a firearms instructor and in executive protection. He recently also worked for two years as a volunteer firefighter in Evans, Colorado. Before that, he worked for ten years as a Larimer County sheriff's deputy. He is a veteran of the United States Marine Corps and the Army National Guard.

Elections
In the 2022 Colorado House of Representatives election, Armagost defeated his Democratic Party opponent, winning 62.65% of the total votes cast.

References

External links
 Legislative website
 Campaign website

21st-century American politicians
Living people
Republican Party members of the Colorado House of Representatives
United States Marines
American firefighters
American police officers
People from Berthoud, Colorado
Year of birth missing (living people)